Lee Hae-ri (born 14 February 1985) is a South Korean singer and musical theater actress. She debuted as a member of Davichi in 2008. Aside from her group's activities, she has established herself as a musical actress, notably through her participation in the original and Korean versions of stage musicals including Tears of Heaven (2011), Mozart, l'opéra rock (2012) and Hero (2014). On April 19, 2017, she debuted as a solo artist with her first extended play, h.

Personal life 
In May 2022, Lee's agency announced that she will marry her non-celebrity boyfriend in July 2022, which will be held as a private event.

Discography

Extended plays

As lead artist

As featured artist

Filmography

TV Program
Immortal Songs 2

Others

Television shows

Musical

Concerts
 2017 Lee Hae Ri Solo Concert 'h'

References

External links
 
 

1985 births
Living people
MBK Entertainment artists
South Korean women pop singers
South Korean female idols
South Korean contemporary R&B singers
South Korean musical theatre actresses
South Korean television personalities